Shaban (also Romanized as Sha‘bān and Shabon; also known as Sa‘bān, Sha‘bānābād, and Shābūn) is a village in Shaban Rural District, in the Central District of Nahavand County, Hamadan Province, Iran. At the 2006 census, its population was 1,756, in 485 families.

References 

Populated places in Nahavand County